Fourpeaked Glacier is a calving glacier in Kodiak Island Borough, Alaska. It is covering much of Fourpeaked Mountain, also known as Fourpeaked Volcano. In the 1950s and up to 1987 Fourpeaked Glacier experienced a dramatic recession which followed by a period of relative stability of it terminus between 1987 and 2000.

See also
Fourpeaked Mountain

References 

Glaciers of Alaska
Glaciers of Kenai Peninsula Borough, Alaska
Glaciers of Kodiak Island Borough, Alaska
Katmai National Park and Preserve